Zena Sharman is a Canadian health researcher and writer, who won the Lambda Literary Award for LGBT Anthology at the 29th Lambda Literary Awards in 2017 for The Remedy: Queer and Trans Voices on Health and Health Care.

The book, an anthology of LGBTQ people's stories about their experiences in the health care system, was published by Arsenal Pulp Press in 2016.

She was previously nominated in the same category at the 24th Lambda Literary Awards in 2012 for Persistence: All Ways Butch and Femme, an anthology which she coedited with Ivan Coyote.

Sharman is currently co-chair of the Catherine White Holman Wellness Centre, a clinic in Vancouver which serves transgender and gender-diverse clients.

References

21st-century Canadian non-fiction writers
Canadian medical writers
Canadian anthologists
Canadian women non-fiction writers
Canadian LGBT writers
Queer writers
Writers from Vancouver
Canadian medical researchers
Living people
Year of birth missing (living people)
Lambda Literary Award winners
21st-century Canadian women writers
21st-century Canadian LGBT people